The 1938 Syracuse Orangemen football team represented Syracuse University in the 1938 college football season. The Orangemen were led by second-year head coach Ossie Solem and played their home games at Archbold Stadium in Syracuse, New York. Syracuse beat Colgate on November 5 at Archbold Stadium, the first in the Colgate–Syracuse football rivalry since 1924.

Schedule

References

Syracuse
Syracuse Orange football seasons
Syracuse Orangemen football